José Marco Davó (1895–1974) was a Spanish film actor.

Selected filmography

 Es mi hombre (1934)
 Don Quintín el amargao (1935) - Nicasio
 La última falla (1940)
 Whirlwind (1941) - Portero
 Dawn of America (1951) - Martín Alonso Pinzón
 I Was a Parish Priest (1953) - Don César
 The Mayor of Zalamea (1954) - Don Lope de Figueroa
 It Happened in Seville (1955) - Fernando Aguilar
 Miracle of Marcelino (1955) - Pascual
 The Coyote (1955) - Sullivan (uncredited)
 Uncle Hyacynth (1956) - Inspector
 También hay cielo sobre el mar (1956)
 Thunderstorm (1956) - Padre Flores
 We're All Necessary (1956) - Campesino, padre familia numerosa
 The Legion of Silence (1956)
 Whom God Forgives (1957) - Fray Francisco
 The Man Who Wagged His Tail (1957) - Judge
 Spanish Affair (1957) - Padre
 La Cenicienta y Ernesto (1957) - Don Rufino
 El tigre de Chamberí (1958) - Sr. Román
 Il marito (1958) - Commendatore Rinaldi
 The Tenant (1958) - Fulgencio
 The Night Heaven Fell (1958) - Le chef de la police
 Vengeance (1958) - Hombre 1
 Let's Make the Impossible! (1958) - Don Emilio
 Los clarines del miedo (1958) - Don Ramón
 La muralla (1958) - Don Javier
 Where Are You Going, Alfonso XII? (1959) - Antonio Cánovas del Castillo
 El Salvador (1959)
 El redentor (1959) - El mal ladrón
 Soft Skin on Black Silk (1959) - Michel
 Luxury Cabin (1959) - Don Fabián Mouriz
 Salto a la gloria (1959) - Don Justo, padre de Santiago
 A Girl Against Napoleon (1959) - Alcalde
 Back to the Door (1959) - Barea
 Vacations in Majorca (1959) - The Police Commissioner (uncredited)
 The Jinx (1959) - Director Banco Metropolitano
 Juanito (1960) - General Vegas
 Alfonso XII and María Cristina (1960) - Antonio Cánovas del Castillo
 A Girl from Chicago (1960)
 Maria, Registered in Bilbao (1960) - Don Ángel
 Hay alguien detrás de la puerta (1961) - Inspector López
 Alerta en el cielo (1961) - Dr. Luis Medina
 Ha llegado un ángel (1961) - Don Ramón
 Kill and Be Killed (1962) - Doctor
 Zorro the Avenger (1962) - Gobernador
 Tómbola (1962) - Don Lorenzo, el párroco
 La gran familia (1962) - Don Pedro
 Shades of Zorro (1962) - Gobernador
 Todos eran culpables (1962) - Señor Costa
 Mi Buenos Aires querido (1962)
 The Sign of the Coyote (1963)
 Marisol rumbo a Río (1963) - Don Fernando
 Gibraltar (1964) - Prestamista
 The Avenger of Venice (1964) - Bembo Altieri
 El señor de La Salle (1964) - Rafrond
 La frontera de Dios (1965)
 Currito of the Cross (1965) - Don Emilio
 Cabriola (1965) - Miguel
 Secuestro en la ciudad (1965) - Don Francisco - comisario
 He's My Man! (1966) - D. Felipe
 Mutiny at Fort Sharpe (1966) - Cabo Brandy
 Fray Torero (1966) - Don Julián
 Los guardiamarinas (1967) - Sr. Ferreira
 Death on High Mountain (1969)
 De Picos Pardos a la ciudad (1969) - Don Melquiades
 Esa mujer (1969) - Juan José (final film role)

References

Bibliography
 Pitts, Michael R. Western Movies: A Guide to 5,105 Feature Films. McFarland, 2012.

External links
 

1895 births
1974 deaths
Spanish male film actors
Spanish male stage actors
People from Alicante